Freddie Connor Burrows Price (born 12 May 2002) is an English footballer who plays as a midfielder for Marine.

Career
Having come through the youth system at Morecambe, Price made his senior debut for the club on 8 September 2020 as a substitute in a 2–1 EFL Trophy defeat to Rochdale. Price made his league debut on 27 October, again as a substitute in a 3–1 defeat to Carlisle United. On 18 November 2020, Price scored a first senior goal with the fourth in a 4–0 thrashing of Manchester United U21s. Following Morecambe's promotion to League One, a one-year contract extension was activated for Price by new manager Stephen Robinson.

Price was released by the club at the end of the 2021–22 season. He signed for Marine in October 2022.

Career statistics

Club

References

2002 births
Living people
English footballers
Association football midfielders
Morecambe F.C. players
Marine F.C. players
English Football League players